Manis is a surname. Notable people with the surname include:

 Andrew M. Manis (born 1954), American historian 
 Chad Manis (fighter) (fl. 2010), mixed martial art fighter
 Chad Manis (football), University of Utah quarterback
 J.T. Manis, author
 Brian Manis, film producer
 Bryan Manis, film producer